Michel Conte, born Michel Seunes, (Villeneuve-sur-Lot 17 July 1932 – 5 January 2008) was a French born, naturalized Canadian choreographer, lyricist and composer of film music and television music.

His compositions were first sung by Lucille Dumont, then by Renée Claude, Monique Leyrac, Suzanne Stevens and Julie Arel.

References

French-language singers of Canada
Conservatoire de Paris alumni
People from Villeneuve-sur-Lot
1932 births
2008 deaths
20th-century Canadian male singers
Canadian songwriters
Canadian film score composers
Canadian television composers
Canadian choreographers
French emigrants to Canada